is a Japanese cyclist. He won the silver medal in the Men's team sprint in the 2004 Summer Olympics along with Toshiaki Fushimi and Tomohiro Nagatsuka. In Japan, he is mostly known as a keirin cyclist. In 2008, he won the Keirin Grand Prix and was the year's top money winner.

References 

1979 births
Living people
Cyclists at the 2004 Summer Olympics
Olympic cyclists of Japan
Olympic silver medalists for Japan
Japanese male cyclists
Olympic medalists in cycling
Keirin cyclists
Medalists at the 2004 Summer Olympics